James Flynn may refer to:
James Edward Flynn (1842–1913), Union Army soldier and Medal of Honor recipient
James Christopher Flynn (1852–1922), Member of Parliament for North Cork, 1885–1910
Jim Flynn (footballer) (1871–1955), Australian rules footballer
Fireman Jim Flynn (1879–1935), bare-knuckle boxer
Jimmy Flynn (rugby union) (1894–1965), Australian rugby union player
James Flynn (fencer) (1907–2000), American Olympic fencer
Jim Flynn (basketball) (died 2006), Irish Olympic basketball player
Jimmy Flynn (1934–2022), American actor
James Flynn (academic) (1934–2020), New Zealand intelligence researcher, also known as Jim Flynn
James Flynn (producer) (died 2023), Irish film and television producer
Jim Flynn (songwriter) (1938–2019), American country music songwriter
James Flynn (politician) (born 1944), former Lieutenant Governor of Wisconsin
James Flynn (rugby union) (born 1993), rugby union player

See also
James O'Flynn (born 1995), Irish hurler